James Davidson Geddes (c. 1844 – March 30, 1895) was a Canadian accountant, rancher and politician who served a term in the Northwest Territories Legislature.

Early life
Geddes, originally from the United States, lived in Galt, Ontario and worked as an accountant for the Merchants Bank. He married his wife, Eliza Fanning at the Trinity Church in Galt on June 12, 1866.

He moved out west in 1882 to the District of Alberta in the Northwest Territories. His ranch was established on land where the Ghost River intersects the Bow River and in 1885 he had 200 head of cattle. The land is now part of Ghost Reservoir Provincial Park.

Political career
Geddes ran for public office to a seat on the North-West Legislative Council in a by-election held on June 28, 1884. The election was the first one held in the city of Calgary in the Calgary electoral district defeated James Oswald in a hotly contested election. He left the Council in 1886.

Geddes died of influenza in March 1895.

References

Members of the Legislative Assembly of the Northwest Territories
Canadian accountants
Year of birth uncertain
1895 deaths